Methylquercetin may refer to:

 Azaleatin (5-methylquercetin)
 Isorhamnetin (3'-methylquercetin)
 Rhamnetin (7-methylquercetin)
 Tamarixetin (4'-methylquercetin)